NK Kiseljak is a Croat-founded football team from the city of Kiseljak, Bosnia and Herzegovina. The club plays in the Second League of the Federation of Bosnia and Herzegovina (West Group). It was formed in 1921 under the name Viktorija, taking on the current name in 1945.

The club plays at the Croatian Defenders Stadium which has a capacity of approximately 3000. While currently in a lower division, NK Kiseljak previously played in the First Federation league and the Premier League.

Honours

League
Second League of the Federation of Bosnia and Herzegovina
Winners (1): 2010-11
First League of Herzeg-Bosnia:
Runners-up (1): 1994–95

Cup
Herzeg-Bosnia Cup
Runners-up (1): 1999–00

Kup SBK/KSB
First place 2020-21

Club seasons
Sources:

References

Association football clubs established in 1921
Kiseljak, NK
Kiseljak, NK
Sport in the Federation of Bosnia and Herzegovina
1921 establishments in Bosnia and Herzegovina